Brush Creek is a stream in southern Laclede County in the U.S. state of Missouri. It is a tributary of the Osage Fork Gasconade River.

The stream flows southeast under I-44 and then generally east passing under Missouri Route C and then route PP north of Morgan.

Brush Creek was named for the thick brush lining its course.

See also
List of rivers of Missouri

References

Rivers of Laclede County, Missouri
Rivers of Missouri
Tributaries of the Gasconade River